Emily Nagoski (born 1977) is an American sex educator and researcher, and author of the book Come as You Are. She is the former director of wellness education at Smith College, where she teaches a course on women's sexuality.

Come as You Are
Among various topics, Come as You Are discusses the difference between "spontaneous" and "responsive" sexual desire, with Nagoski estimating that only around 15% of women experience the former. She also discusses "arousal non-concordance", estimating, based on experiments of responsiveness to sexual stimuli, that there is a roughly 50% overlap between what men find physically and mentally arousing, compared with only 10% for women.

Burnout
In 2019, Nagoski and her twin sister Amelia co-wrote the book Burnout, on the causes and management of stress, including structural factors that particularly affect women. They contrast the relatively short-term dynamics of stress in evolutionary times with modern-day stressors that often go unresolved, and discuss forms of affection and physical activity that help complete what they call the "stress cycle".

References

1977 births
Living people
American sexologists
Indiana University Bloomington alumni
Sex educators
Smith College faculty
Women sexologists
21st-century American women writers
American women academics
21st-century educators
American women educators